David Lehman (born June 11, 1948) is an American poet, non-fiction writer, and literary critic, and the founder and series editor for The Best American Poetry. He was a writer and freelance journalist for fifteen years, writing for such publications as Newsweek, The Wall Street Journal, and The New York Times. In 2006, Lehman served as Editor for the new Oxford Book of American Poetry. He taught and was the Poetry Coordinator at The New School in New York City until May 2018.

Career
Born in New York City, David Lehman grew up the son of European Holocaust refugees in Manhattan's northernmost neighborhood of Inwood. He attended Stuyvesant High School and Columbia University, and Cambridge University in England on a Kellett Fellowship. On his return to New York, he received a Ph.D. in English from Columbia, where he was Lionel Trilling's research assistant. Lehman's poem "The Presidential Years" appeared in The Paris Review No. 43 (Summer 1968) while he was a Columbia undergraduate. The poem was awarded Columbia's Van Rensselaer Poetry Prize in 1967. In 1970 he was named a Woodrow Wilson Fellow and was elected to Phi Beta Kappa.

Lehman taught at Brooklyn College, where he shared an office with John Ashbery, for a year. For four years starting in 1976, he was an assistant professor of English at Hamilton College, teaching courses in literature and creative writing and chairing the college's lecture committee, bringing prominent speakers to campus. In 1980 he received a post-doctoral fellowship from the Society for the Humanities at Cornell University. He then left academe and became a freelance writer. He wrote numerous book reviews and articles for Newsweek and contributed to such other publications as the New York Times Magazine, the Washington Post Book World, the Los Angeles Times, the Boston Globe, Newsday, the Chicago Tribune, and the Philadelphia Inquirer. He became a contributing editor of Columbia College Today in 1982 and of Partisan Review in 1986. In 1987 he joined the board of the National Book Critics Circle and was named vice president in charge of programs and events. In 1988 he founded "The Best American Poetry" annual anthology series. The Perfect Murder (1989) and  Signs of the Times: Deconstruction and the Fall of Paul de Man (1991) were his first nonfiction books.

Lehman's books of poetry include Playlist (2019), Poems in the Manner Of (2017), New and Selected Poems (2013), Yeshiva Boys (2009), When a Woman Loves a Man (2005), The Evening Sun (2002), The Daily Mirror (2000), and Valentine Place (1996), all published by Scribner. Princeton University Press published Operation Memory (1990), and An Alternative to Speech (1986). He collaborated with James Cummins on a book of sestinas, Jim and Dave Defeat the Masked Man (Soft Skull Press, 2005), and with Judith Hall on a book of poems and collages, Poetry Forum (Bayeux Arts, 2007). Since 2009, new poems have been published in 32 Poems, The Atlantic, The Awl, Barrow Street, The Common, Green Mountains Review, Hanging Loose, Hot Street, New Ohio Review, The New Yorker, Poetry, Poetry London, Sentence, Smartish Pace, Slate, and The Yale Review.

Lehman's poems appear in Chinese in the bilingual anthology, Contemporary American Poetry, published through a partnership between the NEA and the Chinese government, and in the Mongolian-English Anthology of American Poetry. Lehman's work has been translated into 16 languages overall, including Spanish, French, German, Danish, Russian, Polish, Korean and Japanese. In 2013, his translation of Goethe’s "Wandrers Nachtlied" into English appeared under the title "Goethe’s Nightsong" in The New Republic, and his translation of Guillaume Apollinaire’s "Zone" was published with an introductory essay in Virginia Quarterly Review. The translation and commentary won the journal's Emily Clark Balch Prize for 2014. Additionally, his poem, "French Movie" appears in the third season of Motionpoems.

Lehman is the series editor of The Best American Poetry. The prestigious annual series has 33 volumes published (including special tenth and twenty-fifth anniversary editions); the current (2019) volume was edited by Major Jackson. Further, Lehman has edited The Oxford Book of American Poetry (Oxford University Press, 2006). The Best American Erotic Poems: From 1800 to the Present (Scribner, 2008), and Great American Prose Poems: From Poe to the Present (Scribner, 2003).

He is the author of nine nonfiction books, including, most recently, "One Hundred Autobiographies: A Memoir" (2019), "Sinatra's Century: One Hundred Notes on the Man and His World (2015), and "The State of the Art: A Chronicle of American Poetry, 1988-2014" (2015). A Fine Romance: Jewish Songwriters, American Songs (Nextbook, 2009) received a 2010 ASCAP Deems Taylor Award from the American Society of Composers, Authors and Publishers. Sponsored by the American Library Association, Lehman curated, wrote, and designed a traveling library exhibit based on A Fine Romance that toured 55 libraries in 27 states between May 2011 and April 2012 with appearances at three libraries in New York state and Maryland.

In an interview published in Smithsonian Magazine, Lehman discusses the artistry of the great lyricists: “The best song lyrics seem to me so artful, so brilliant, so warm and humorous, with both passion and wit, that my admiration is matched only by my envy ... these lyricists needed to work within boundaries, to get complicated emotions across and fit the lyrics to the music, and to the mood thereof. That takes genius.”

Lehman's other books of criticism include The Last Avant-Garde: The Making of the New York School of Poets (Doubleday, 1998), which was named a "Book to Remember 1999" by the New York Public Library; The Big Question (1995); The Line Forms Here (1992) and Signs of the Times: Deconstruction and the Fall of Paul de Man (1991). His study of detective novels, The Perfect Murder (1989), was nominated for an Edgar Award from the Mystery Writers of America. A new edition of The Perfect Murder appeared in 2000.  In October 2015, he published Sinatra's Century: One Hundred Notes on the Man and His World, which Geoffrey O'Brien in "The New York Review of Books" praised as an "engaging, playful, deeply personal, and elegantly concise tribute."

Lehman made his living primarily as a journalist and free-lance writer for fifteen years. His by-line appeared  frequently in Newsweek in the 1980s and he has continued writing for general-interest magazines and newspapers, among them The New York Times, The Wall Street Journal, American Heritage, the Washington Post, People, The Academy of American Poets, National Public Radio, Salon, Slate, Smithsonian, and Art in America. He has been a contributing editor at The American Scholar, since 2009. From May 2014 until September 2019, he acted as quiz master for the weekly column Next Line, Please, a public poetry-writing contest. The first project was a crowd-sourced sonnet, "Monday," which was completed in August 2014. There followed a haiku, a tanka, an anagram based on Ralph Waldo Emerson's middle name, a couplet (which grew into a "sonnet ghazal"), and a "shortest story" competition. Lehman devises the puzzles — or prompts — and judges the results. Lehman now writes a monthly column on movies for "The American Scholar".

The Library of Congress commissioned an essay from Lehman, “Peace and War in American Poetry,” and posted it online in April 2013. In 2013, Lehman wrote the introduction to The Collected Poems of Joseph Ceravolo.  He had previously written introductory essays to books by A. R. Ammons, Kenneth Koch, Philip Larkin, Alfred Leslie, Fairfield Porter, Karl Shapiro, and Mark Van Doren.

In 1994 Lehman succeeded Donald Hall as the general editor of the University of Michigan Press’s Poets on Poetry series, a position he held for twelve years. In 1997 he teamed with Star Black in creating and directing the famed KGB Bar Monday-night poetry series in New York City’s East Village. Lehman and Black co-edited The KGB Bar Book of Poems (HarperCollins, 2000). They directed the reading series until 2003.

Lehman taught in the graduate writing program of the New School in New York City since the program's inception in 1996 and served as poetry coordinator from 2003 to 2018. In an interview with Thomas M. Disch in the Cortland Review, Lehman addresses his great variety of poetic styles: "I write in a lot of different styles and forms on the theory that the poems all sound like me in the end, so why not make them as different from one another as possible, at least in outward appearance? If you write a new poem every day, you will probably have by the end of the year, if you’re me, an acrostic, an abecedarium, a sonnet or two, a couple of prose poems, poems that have arbitrary restrictions, such as the one I did that has only two words per line."

Lehman has been awarded fellowships from the John Simon Guggenheim Memorial Foundation, the Ingram Merrill Foundation, and the NEA, and received an award in literature from the American Academy of Arts and Letters and a Lila Wallace-Reader's Digest Writer's Award. The Lila Wallace grant enabled Lehman to organize and host a series of poetry readings and school visitations in collaboration with the Community School of Music and Art in Ithaca, New York. The visiting poets were Mark Strand and Donald Hall (1992), Charles Simic, Jorie Graham, and A. R. Ammons (1993), and Louise Gluck, Kenneth Koch, and John Ashbery (1994).

Lehman has lectured widely in the United States and abroad. He divides his time between Ithaca, New York, and New York City.  He is married to Stacey Harwood.

Bibliography

Poetry 
 Breakfast. Sycamore Press, Oxford, England (1968); ed. John Fuller. Sycamore broadside #2.
Some Nerve. Columbia Review Press. New York (1973).
 On Borrowed Time. Nobodaddy Press, New York, Poetry in Motion No. 1, Signed Limited Edition, (1976), First issue of a series of poetry broadsheets.
 Day One. Nobodaddy Press, Clinton, New York (1979).
Mythologies, Poetry Foundation (1987).
February 21, Kalliope, a journal of women's art and literature (1998).
Poetry Collections 

The Perfect Murder: A Study in Detection (The Free Press, 1989; revised ed. Michigan 2000)
Operation Memory (Princeton, 1990)
Signs of the Times: Deconstruction and the Fall of Paul de Man (Poseidon / Simon & Schuster, 1991)
The Line Forms Here (Michigan, 1992)
The Big Question (Michigan, 1995)
Valentine Place (Scribner, 1996)
The Last Avant-Garde: The Making of the New York School of Poets (Doubleday, 1998; Vintage paperback 1979)
The Daily Mirror: A Journal in Poetry (2000)
The Evening Sun (Scribner, 2002)
When a Woman Loves a Man (Scribner, 2005)
Yeshiva Boys (Scribner, 2009)
A Fine Romance: Jewish Songwriters, American Songs (Shocken / Random House, 2009)
New and Selected Poems (Scribner, 2013)
Poems in the Manner of (Scribner, 2017)
Playlist (Pittsburgh, 2019)

Anthologies and edited collections of other poets
Next Line, Please(Cornell, 2018)
The Best of the Best American Poetry: 25th Anniversary Edition with Robert Pinsky (Scribner, 2013)
The Best American Erotic Poems (Scribner, 2008)
The Oxford Book of American Poetry (2006)

Great American Prose Poems: From Poe to the Present (2003)
The KGB Bar Book of Poems with Star Black (HarperCollins, 2000)
The Best of the Best American Poetry, 1988-1997 with Harold Bloom (Scribner, 1998)
Ecstatic Occasions, Expedient Forms: 85 Leading Contemporary Poets Select and Comment on Their Poems (1987, expanded 1996)
The Best American Poetry with guest editors
Tracy K. Smith (2021)
Paisley Rekdal (2020)
Major Jackson (2019),
Dana Gioia (2018),
Natasha Tretheway (2017),
Edward Hirsch (2016),
Sherman Alexie (2015),
Terrance Hayes (2014),
Denise Duhamel (2013),
Mark Doty (2012),
Kevin Young (2011),
Amy Gerstler (2010),
David Wagoner (2009),
Charles Wright (2008),
Heather McHugh (2007),
Billy Collins (2006),
Paul Muldoon (2005),
Lyn Hejinian (2004),
Yusef Komunyakaa (2003),
Robert Creeley (2002),
Robert Hass (2001),
Rita Dove (2000),
Robert Bly (1999),
John Hollander (1998),
James Tate (1997),
Adrienne Rich (1996),
Richard Howard (1995),
A. R. Ammons (1994),
Louise Glück (1993),
Charles Simic (1992),
Mark Strand (1991),
Jorie Graham (1990),
Donald Hall (1989) and
John Ashbery (1988).
Other
One Hundred Autobiographies: A Memoir (Cornell, 2019)
 Sinatra's Century: One Hundred Notes on the Man and His World (HarperCollins, 2015)
 The State of the Art: A Chronicle of American Poetry, 1988-2014 (Pittsburgh, 2015)
Jim and Dave Defeat the Masked Man with James Cummins and Archie Rand (Soft Skull Press, 2005)
Poetry Forum: A Play Poem: A Pl'em with Judith Hall (Bayeux Arts, 2007)
List of poems

Critical studies, reviews and biography
Beyond Amazement: New Essays on John Ashbery (1980)
James Merrill: Essays in Criticism with Charles Berger (Cornell University Press, 1983) 
Sinatra's Century: One Hundred Notes on the Man and His World (2015)
The State of the Art: A Chronicle of American Poetry, 1988-2014 (2015)

References

External links
Essay: David Lehman on post-modernism
Lehman Explains Motivation for The Last Avant-Garde
Film adaptation: Lehman's "French Movie" in Motionpoems Festival, 2011
Commentary: Lehman on Frank O'Hara's "Meditations in an Emergency" in AMC's Mad Men, Mad Men blog, 2009
Interview: David Lehman in Eurozine, 2009
Television appearance: David Lehman on PBS, 2006
Interview: David Lehman with Jane Hammond, Bomb Magazine, 2002
Review: Lehman's The Evening Sun in The Adirondack Review, 2002
Interview: David Lehman with A. R. Ammons, The Paris Review, 1996
David Lehman Papers. Yale Collection of American Literature, Beinecke Rare Book and Manuscript Library.

1948 births
Living people
American male poets
Jewish American poets
Columbia Graduate School of Arts and Sciences alumni
The New Yorker people
University of Michigan staff
Columbia College (New York) alumni
21st-century American Jews
Anthologists